DW3 may refer to:

Death Wish 3
Digimon World 3
Dragon Warrior III
Dynasty Warriors 3